Polystichum dudleyi is a species of fern known by the common name Dudley's sword fern. It is endemic to California, where it is known from the forests of the central and southern California Coast Ranges.

Description
The Polystichum dudleyi fern produces several arching leaves up to a meter-3 feet long. Each lance-shaped leaf is made up of many lance-shaped leaflets which are deeply divided into smaller segments.

References

External links
Jepson Manual Treatment - Polystichum dudleyi
Polystichum dudleyi - Photo gallery

dudleyi
Ferns of California
Endemic flora of California